Senator Robert F. Wagner Houses, also known as Triborough Houses, is a public housing development in the East Harlem neighborhood of Manhattan, in New York City and is administered by the New York City Housing Authority. It is located east of Second Avenue in the northeast corner of Manhattan, consists of fourteen 16-story buildings and eight 7-story buildings, a total of 22 buildings. It has 5,290 residents who live in 2,162 apartments. The complex occupies . It cost $30,926,000 to construct.

Development 
Demolition of existing buildings on the site began in 1954 and eliminated many stores, businesses, and residents. The development was completed on May 31, 1958, and was named after Robert F. Wagner, who served four terms as senator of New York State and sponsor of the 1937 Housing Act. Its 7- and 16-story buildings are in in-line slab and X-slab formations, covering 12.9% of the site.

The first family to move into the Wagner Houses, on August 3, 1958, moved from a cold-water flat on East 106th Street, which was also demolished to build Franklin Plaza Apartments.

See also 
New York City Housing Authority
List of New York City Housing Authority properties

References 

development map

Residential buildings completed in 1958
Residential buildings in Manhattan
Public housing in Manhattan
East Harlem